Ko Ko Gyi (born 18 December 1961) is a Burmese politician and leading democracy activist. For his protests against the military government, he spent over 17 years in prison on multiple occasions between 1989 and 2012. He was considered a prisoner of conscience by Amnesty International. BBC News describes him as a key member of the 8888 Generation movement. He is one of the country's most prominent activists, second only to Min Ko Naing.

Political activism

1988 protests
In 1988, Ko Ko Gyi was a final year international relations major at Yangon University when the 1988 Uprising began. Ko Ko Gyi, together with fellow student leaders, led a peaceful rally on the campus of Yangon University on 15 March 1988. On 16 March 1988 he was among the students who were beaten by the police on the main street in front of the school while they were attempting to march to the Yangon Institute of Technology. On 28 August 1988, he became the vice-chair of the All Burma Federation of Student Unions (ABSFU) led by Min Ko Naing.

Political imprisonment
He was arrested on 27 April 1989, and held in detention for 44 days. Following his release, he led the ABSFU from July 1989 to December 1991, while his friend and colleague Min Ko Naing remained in detention. He was arrested again on 11 December 1991 for his involvement in a student protest at Yangon University, held to honor Aung San Suu Kyi, who was under house arrest, for her receiving the Nobel Peace Prize.

He was initially sentenced to 20 years' imprisonment with hard labor but the sentence was later reduced to 10 years. When he completed his prison term, the authorities continued to detain him under section 10(A) of the State Protection Act. He was eventually released in March 2005, after spending more than 13 years in prison. On 27 September 2006, he was arrested, together with Min Ko Naing, Htay Kywe, Min Zeya and Pyone Cho, for their pro-democracy activities, including the White Sunday Campaign, which began in early 2006. He was released on 11 January 2007.

Saffron Revolution
Ko Ko Gyi returned to politics shortly after his release. In August 2007, he and other activists from the 88 Generation movement marched to protest against high fuel prices. The protests led to the Saffron Revolution, largest demonstrations against the military government since 1988. On 21 August 2007, he and other prominent activists were arrested again. He was detained in prison without trial for more than a year until 28 August 2008. On 11 November, he was sentenced to 65 years in prison. On 13 January 2012, he was released as part of a mass presidential pardon of political prisoners with nearly 600 other political prisoners from custody.

Political career

He was an observer to peace talks at the Myanmar Peace Centre. He was a member of Rakhine Investigation Commission to investigate the deadly sectarian violence in Rakhine state. On 28 August 2012, Ko Ko Gyi published a collection of political interviews entitled Free Expression (ပြောချင်လို့ပြောခဲ့တာတွေ).

He had planned to run for a seat in 2015 elections from the National League for Democracy.  But, to the surprise of many, his name was omitted from the NLD’s candidate list.

Personal life
Ko Ko Gyi is married to Khin Thu Thu Win in 2014 and they have one child.

Notes

References

1961 births
Living people
Amnesty International prisoners of conscience held by Myanmar
Burmese democracy activists
People from Yangon
University of Yangon alumni
Burmese prisoners and detainees
Government Technical Institute (Pyay) alumni